The Kawasaki Vulcan 800 Drifter is a 1940s-styled cruiser loosely based on the lines of the c. 1940 Chief produced by the Indian  Manufacturing Company.

Features
The Drifter VN800 is powered by a modern, carbureted, single overhead cam, single pin, liquid cooled 805 cc 55-degree V-twin engine.  The twin cylinders have 'cooling fins', but they are almost entirely for show.

The Drifter has a hidden rear mono-shock to make it appear to be a hard-tail, akin to a Harley-Davidson Softail.  The front and rear fenders cover about half of the respective wheel, and are the most striking visual cue.

Discontinued
When Kawasaki revealed its 2007 models, the 800 Drifter no longer appeared in the Vulcan line-up.

References

Vulcan 800 Drifter
Cruiser motorcycles